Greetings from L.A. is the seventh album by singer-songwriter Tim Buckley, released in August 1972. It was recorded at Far Out Studios in Hollywood, California. Like most of his other albums, Greetings from L.A. did not sell well, although this is probably his best seller (there at least 2 different US pressings: the first with removable postcard and dark green WB label, the second had no perforations for the postcard and had the Burbank WB label), getting substantial airplay in the Twin Cities on the Minneapolis FM station KQRS and selling very well at the independent record shops in Minneapolis-St. Paul and elsewhere (Detroit, New York, etc.) until it was deleted by Warner Brothers (whereupon Greetings continued to sell as a UK/European import into the '80's).

The album was later re-released on November 7, 2005, in a compilation with debut album Tim Buckley by Elektra.

Track listing
All tracks by Tim Buckley, except where noted.

Personnel
Tim Buckley – 12-string guitar, vocals
Venetta Fields, Clydie King, Lorna Willard – vocals
Joe Falsia – guitar; string arrangements on "Sweet Surrender" and "Make It Right"
Chuck Rainey – bass guitar
Reinhold Press - bass guitar on "Make It Right"
Harry Hyams, Ralph Schaeffer – viola
Louis Kievman – violin
Robert Konrad – violin, guitar
William Kurasch – violin
Jesse Ehrlich – cello on "Make It Right"
Kevin Kelly – organ, piano
Paul Ross Novros, Eugene E. Siegel – saxophone on "Move With Me"
Jerry Goldstein – percussion, arranger, producer
Carter C.C. Collins – congas
King Errisson - congas
Ed Greene – drums
Technical
Chris Huston, Stan Agol – engineer
Cal Schenkel – album design
Bob Gordon – cover photography

References 

Tim Buckley albums
1972 albums
Albums produced by Jerry Goldstein (producer)
Straight Records albums